Putaqa (Quechua for Rumex peruanus, also spelled Potacca, Potaga, Putaca, Putacca, Putaja) may refer to:

 Putaqa (Ancash), a mountain in the Ancash Region, Peru
 Putaqa (Huánuco), a mountain in the Huánuco Region, Peru
 Putaqa (Junín), a mountain in the Junín Region, Peru
 Putaqa (Pasco), a mountain in the Pasco Region, Peru